1Sulaman is a mixed development project comprising condominium, water theme park, shoplots, recreational landscape park and serviced suites. The project is divided into parcel 1 (31-storey Platinum Tower), parcel 2 (Wismas) and parcel 3 (35-storey Gold tower).

The project is developed by Sagajuta Sabah Sdn Bhd, and predicted to be completed in 2015. However, due to several issues, the building remained unfinished until 2016, leading to the developer being sued by property lots buyers as well as from the Malaysian Inland Revenue Board. On 24 November 2016, the project was officially declared abandoned by the Ministry of Local Government.

Construction of the 31-storey Platinum tower had been revived by the PH-Warisan government in March 2020. The new completion date is scheduled to be in 2022.

Lawsuit 
On 21 June 2016, the Malaysian Inland Revenue Board sued the developer over its failure to settle its tax arrears totalling  over RM8.5 million. The Sabah state government also have since declared the project as abandoned and appointed a new developer to finish the project. The project was subsequently undertaken by UHY Advisory (KL) Sdn Bhd on 15 January 2018 as stated in the website of Sabah Ministry of Local Government and Housing, although further rescue proposed scheme by court requesting the buyers to paid an additional RM130 per square foot to Excel Glamour Housing Sdn Bhd to complete the final 20% of the project has drawn objections since the firm was appointed without any open tender as well the way the company seems to be profiting from the problem.

References 

Buildings and structures in Kota Kinabalu